James Gell may refer to:

Sir James Gell (1823–1905), Manx lawyer, First Deemster and Clerk of the Rolls on the Isle of Man
James Stowell Gell (1855–1919), son of Sir James Gell. Manx advocate and High Bailiff